Matty is a given name or nickname, frequently of the male given name Matthew. It can also be a surname.

Given name or nickname
Notable people with the given name or nickname include:

A–E
 Matty Alou (1938–2011), Major League Baseball player from the Dominican Republic
 Matty Appleby (born 1972), English former footballer
 Matty Ashurst (born 1989), English rugby league player
 Matty Askin (born 1988), English cruiserweight boxer 
 Matty Baldwin (1885–1918), American boxer
 Matty Beharrell (born 1993) English professional rugby league player
 Matty Bell (1899–1983), American college football player, football and basketball head coach and athletics administrator
 Matty Blair (born 1989), English footballer
 Matty Blythe (born 1988), English rugby league player
 Matty Cash (born 1997), Polish footballer
 Matty Cardarople (born 1983), American actor
 Matty Dale (born 1986), English rugby league player
 Matty Dawson (born 1990), English rugby league player
 Matty Dixon (born 1994), English professional footballer
 Matty Edwards (born 1991), English footballer

F–L
 Matty Fleming (born 1996), English rugby league player 
 Matty Fouhy (1924–1977), Irish hurler
 Matty Fozard (born 1995), English rugby league player
 Matty Fryatt (born 1986), English footballer
 Matty Geoghegan ( 1936), Irish footballer
 Matty Hadden (born 1990), rugby league player from Northern Ireland
 Matty Healy (born 1989), British musician, lead singer of The 1975
 Matty Holmes (born 1969), English former footballer
 Matty Hughes (born 1992), English footballer
 Matthew Ianniello (1920–2012), New York mobster known as "Matty the Horse"
 Matty James (born 1991), English footballer
 Matthew Johns (born 1971), Australian rugby league football commentator and former player, star of The Matty Johns Show variety television show
 Matty Kay (born 1989), English footballer
 Matty Kemp (1907–1999), American film actor
 Matty Lee (born 1998), British diver
 Matty Lewis (born 1975)  American musician, rhythm guitarist and co-lead singer of Zebrahead
 Matty Lund (born 1990), English footballer

M–T
 Matty Maher (born 1856), Irish hurler
 Matty Malneck (1903–1981), American jazz bandleader, violinist, violist and songwriter
 Matty Marsh, English rugby league player
 Matty Matlock (1907–1978), American Dixieland jazz clarinetist, saxophonist and arranger
 Matty McNair, American explorer
 Matty Mullins (born 1988), lead singer of American band Memphis May Fire
 Matty Pattison (born 1986), South African footballer
 Matty Pearson (born 1993), English footballer
 Matty Poole, English footballer who made his professional debut in 2009
 Matty Power (1901–1965), Irish hurler
 Matty Rich (born 1971), American film director, screenwriter, and video game executive
 Matty Roberts (disambiguation), several people
 Matty Robson (born 1985), English footballer
 Matty Russell (born 1993), Scottish rugby league player
 Matty Simmons, American film and television producer, and newspaper reporter
 Matty Smith (born 1987), English rugby league player
 Matty Templeton (born 1996) is an English footballer

Surname
 Leigh Matty, a member of the British rock band Romeo's Daughter
 Richard P. Matty (born 1932), American politician

Arts, entertainment, and media

Songs
 "Matty", a song by Irish folk singer Christy Moore from the album "Ordinary Man"

Fictional characters
 the title character of the English folk ballad "Matty Groves"
 Matty Levan, in Skins
 Matty Nolan, in the British soap opera Brookside
 Matty McKibben, in the Awkward television series

See also
 Mattie (name)

Lists of people by nickname